Michael T. Knight (January 29, 1832 – August 7, 1916) was an official and politician in Newfoundland. He represented Twillingate from 1885 to 1889 as a Liberal and from 1893 to 1894 as a Conservative and Bay de Verde from 1900 to 1904 as a Liberal in the Newfoundland House of Assembly.

He was born in St. John's and was educated at Castle Rennie there. Knight was first employed as a clerk with P. Rogerson and Co. From 1865 to 1876, he was a customs collector in Labrador, then served as secretary for the Board of Works. He was an unsuccessful candidate for a seat in the Newfoundland assembly in 1882. He was elected to the assembly in 1885 and served in the Executive Council as financial secretary. He was defeated when he ran for reelection in 1889 but was elected again in 1893. Knight was named to cabinet in 1894 but was defeated when he ran for reelection as was required at the time. He was elected again for Bay de Verde in 1900.

References 

Members of the Newfoundland and Labrador House of Assembly
1832 births
1916 deaths
Newfoundland Colony people
Members of the Executive Council of Newfoundland and Labrador